Lectionary 1684, designated by ℓ1684, in the Gregory-Aland numbering, is a Greek manuscript of the New Testament, on parchment leaves, dated paleographically to the 13th century.

Description  

It is written in Greek minuscule letters, on 166 parchment leaves (27 by 21 cm), 2 columns per page, 23-26 lines per page. 
The codex contains some Lessons from the four Gospels lectionary (Evangelistarium) with some lacunae. According to the colophon it was written in 1247. 
A large portion of this manuscripts is a palimpsest. The lower text was written in uncial letters in 8th century, it contains the text of the four Gospels and was catalogued as Uncial 0233 by INTF. 

The codex now is located in the Bible Museum Münster (MS. 1).

See also  

 List of New Testament lectionaries 
 Textual criticism 
 Bible Museum Münster

References

Further reading  

 S. P. Lambros, Νέος Ἑλληνομνήμων 12 (1915), p. 465 ff.

External links  

 Lectionary 1684 at the CSNTM 
 Manuscripts of the Bible Museum 

Greek New Testament lectionaries
13th-century biblical manuscripts